Rose Edwina Tapner (born 16 October 1995) is an English model and television presenter.

Background
Tapner was born in London and grew up in Chipperfield, Hertfordshire. She is the daughter of Alex and Rory Tapner, and she has a brother, Arthur. She was educated at Downe House School, in Cold Ash, Berkshire, graduating in 2014. Tapner has taken part in British Eventing competitions, and in July 2014, she was appointed an ambassador for the British Equestrian Federation.

Career
Tapner was discovered by Storm Model Management in 2011 at the Birmingham Clothes Show Live, and soon after, at the age of 15, became the face of Balenciaga's 2012 campaigns. Since then Tapner has appeared in campaigns for Topshop, Selfridges, Chloé, Burberry, and has been featured in Numéro, Pop, British Vogue, W, and LOVE. Tapner has walked for designers including Giles Deacon, Michael van der Ham, Todd Lynn, and Nicolas Ghesquière, and has been shot by photographers including Steven Meisel.

Tapner has been compared to fellow British model Cara Delevingne.

Personal life
Tapner is friends with fellow British models Cara Delevingne and Jourdan Dunn.

References

External links
 

Living people
1996 births
English female models
Models from London
People educated at Downe House School
People from Dacorum (district)
People from Westminster
Television personalities from Hertfordshire
Television personalities from London